Lachesis brachystoma is an outdated scientific name that may refer to the following two species of hognosed pitvipers:

 Porthidium nasutum
 Porthidium lansbergii